Albert Diebold (7 December 1895 – 7 November 1955) was a French rower. He competed in the men's eight event at the 1920 Summer Olympics.

References

External links
 

1895 births
1955 deaths
French male rowers
Olympic rowers of France
Rowers at the 1920 Summer Olympics
Sportspeople from Strasbourg
People from Alsace-Lorraine